Botovo is a rural locality (a village) and the administrative center of Yargomzhskoye Rural Settlement, Cherepovetsky District, Vologda Oblast, Russia. The population was 2,229 as of 2002. There are 15 streets.

Geography 
Fenevo is the nearest rural locality.

References 

Rural localities in Cherepovetsky District